was a Japanese statesman and educator in Meiji period Japan.

Biography 

Tanaka was born in Owari Province (present-day Aichi Prefecture). After the Meiji Restoration, he was selected to accompany the Iwakura Mission on its around-the-world journey to the United States and Europe. He was especially impressed from what he saw of western educational systems. On his return to Japan in March 1873 (six months earlier than the rest of the Mission), he was made Vice Minister for Education in 1874.

He returned to the United States in 1877 for further first-hand research on school systems. He spent considerable time at Amherst College and approached Amherst president Julius H. Seelye for advice. He also visited the Centennial Exposition in Philadelphia, after which he submitted a report with photographs to the government. On his return to Japan, Tanaka strongly criticized the Education Order of 1875, which he felt made the system too centralized and inflexible. The new Education Order of 1879 was based on his experiences in the United States, but it quickly came under attack as being confusing and inviting moral decay. Tanaka transferred from the Ministry of Education in 1880 to the Ministry of Justice, and subsequently served in various positions in the Meiji government.

See also
History of Education in Japan

1845 births
1909 deaths
Meiji Restoration
People from Gifu Prefecture
Japanese educators
Government ministers of Japan
Recipients of the Legion of Honour
Members of the Iwakura Mission